The 1992 PGA Tour of Australasia was a series of men's professional golf events played mainly in Australia and New Zealand.

The season marked the first year in which the Australian Open was granted "flagship event" status of the PGA Tour of Australasia by the Official World Golf Ranking.

Schedule
The following table lists official events during the 1992 season.

Unofficial events
The following events were sanctioned by the PGA Tour of Australasia, but did not carry official money, nor were wins official.

Order of Merit
The Order of Merit was based on prize money won during the season, calculated in Australian dollars.

Notes

References

External links

PGA Tour of Australasia
Australasia
PGA Tour of Australasia
PGA Tour of Australasia